"In Command" is a song by Swedish dance music duo Rob'n'Raz, featuring American singer Lutricia McNeal and rapper D-Flex. Released in November 1993 as the fourth single from the duo's second album, Clubhopping (The Album) (1992), it became very successful in Sweden, peaking at number-one, with a total of 17 weeks within the Swedish singles chart. Additionally, the song peaked at number four in Finland and was a top 40 hit on the Eurochart Hot 100, reaching number 39 in January 1994. Outside Europe, it was a huge hit in Israel, peaking at number three. It also won an award in the category for Best Swedish Dance Track 1993 at the 1994 Swedish Dance Music Awards.

Critical reception
Pan-European magazine Music & Media wrote, "The club hoppers celebrate their first Swedish number 1 hit with a "Culture Haddaway Project" type of bleeping pop dance stomper according to the proven male rap/female chorus formula."

Music video
A music video was produced to promote the single. It takes place in a large white room, where a group of men come in and sit down on separate chairs. Lutricia McNeal performs among them in a commanding manner, wearing a tight suit. The men then lay all the chairs on top of each other in a large pile, before they hand over a green apple to the next person who in turn passes it on. Sometimes a black mini pig is seen walking around on the floor.  D-Flex raps with his muscular upper body bare. The men each then pick up their chairs from the pile and sit down on it again. As the video ends, they are sitting around a long covered table, apparently ready for a meal. As the lid of the dish on the table is lifted, it is revealed that it is a green apple. In the 2020 book,  Move Your Body (2 The 90s): Unlimited Eurodance, Juha Soininen noted that "In Command" had "a very visual music video, where Lutricia's and D-Flex's best parts were exploited with humorous undertones."

Track listing
 Sweden, CD maxi (1993)
"In Command" (Remix Radio Edit) – 4:19
"In Command" (Original Radio Edit) – 3:44
"In Command" (Seize Command Mix) – 6:22
"In Command" (Deuce Dub) – 6:28
"In Command" (Nice & Stones Club Dub) – 4:24
"In Command" (Extended Version) – 5:54
"In Command" (Indee's H-Way Judgement Mix) – 5:54

Charts

Weekly charts

Year-end charts

Certifications

References

1993 singles
1993 songs
Rob'n'Raz songs
Number-one singles in Sweden
Warner Music Group singles
English-language Swedish songs